Dwayne Tan is a Singaporean actor and singer.

Biography
Tan graduated from the American Musical and Dramatic Academy in New York. He began his training at the Singapore Armed Forces Music and Drama Company (SAF MDC). He is also a Singapore Repertory Theatre Young Company (SRT YC) alumnus and a member of the Association of Singapore Actors.

He began acting in Singapore with Theatreworks' musical, Beauty World and has worked with many other theatre companies like Action Theatre, The Necessary Stage, Imaginarts, luna-id, Wildrice and Igor's: The Main Event, in musicals and plays alike. For over a year, he sang at the comedy cabaret club, the Boom Boom Room.

His work occasionally extends into TV and radio. Tan was one of the top 30 contestants in the 1st season of Singapore Idol. Tan has also lent his voice to many characters in cartoons like One Piece, the second Yu-Gi-Oh! anime series (Yu-Gi-Oh! Duel Monsters), and Machine Robo Rescue. For 5 years, he hosted the Sunday morning show on the arts radio station Passion 99.5FM.

He became a finalist on Singapore Idol; due to this he produced his Moments Alone, an EP.

He also released his novel, "My Cup of Teh-O: A Singaporean Boy's Search for Home in America", which is a narrative loosely based on his life in New York City. On his official website, there are links to sample chapters of his work.

On film, Tan has appeared in Cyber Wars (starring Joan Chen) and was involved in a scene as a New York tourist with Susan Sarandon, in Disney's Enchanted. Tan fulfilled his Disney dreams when he sang for the opening of Disney On Ice in Kuala Lumpur.

Tan has been trained in puppeteering by fellow voice actor Brian Zimmerman.

Voice acting credits
(For Singaporean dubs only)
 Joey Wheeler (Katsuya Jonouchi) in Yu-Gi-Oh!.
 Mr. 2, Mr. 3, Dalton and Portgas D. Ace in One Piece
 Katsutoshi Hayashibara in Zipang
 Makoto Fujitani in Karin (American dub)
 Dylan Yuki, Sasuke, Peter, Jirou, Shirou, Chai, Mr. Tsuchida and Otome in Mirmo!
 Ace, Jay, Ken, Sasaki, SubmarineRobo and GyroRobo in Machine Robo Rescue
 Noda in Gokusen
 Satoshi Horio in The Prince of Tennis

Television acting credits
Singapore Shakes
Incredible Tales – Banana Tree Spirit
Behind Closed Doors – Toy Boys
Sunshine Station
Heartland Hubby
HBO's Serangoon Road

Performance credits
 Junie B. Jones US National Tour 2007
 Magicbox
 Much Ado About Nothing
 Romeo and Juliet
 Army Daze

Musical credits
 Thoroughly Modern Millie
 Beauty World
 Snow White and the Seven Dwarfs
 Pinocchio
 Spring Awakening

References

External links
 Dwayne Tan Connected (Official Website)
 Dwayne's Delirious Den
 Dwayne's Music Store
 

Living people
Male musical theatre actors
Singaporean male stage actors
Singaporean male television actors
Place of birth missing (living people)
Singaporean male voice actors
Singaporean people of Chinese descent
Year of birth missing (living people)
21st-century Singaporean male actors